Héctor Cuadros (born March 20, 1983, in Guadalajara, Jalisco) is a Mexican former professional footballer who played as a midfielder.

Career
Cuadros spent the 2005 Major League Soccer season with C.D. Chivas USA. Cuadros came to Chivas USA as one of imports from parent club Chivas de Guadalajara. Nicknamed El Grillo, he became the expansion club's first starting central midfielder and scored the penalty kick goal that gave Chivas USA their first win ever, 1–0 over fellow expansion team Real Salt Lake. He suffered a concussion after a clash with New England Revolution defender Joey Franchino.  Cuadros was released by Chivas USA in November 2005 despite leading the team in goals with four. In December 2005, Chivas loaned Cuadros to Delfines de Coatzacoalcos a team in the Mexican Primera A (second division) on a 6-month loan.

References

External links
 

1983 births
Living people
Mexican footballers
Association football midfielders
Chivas USA players
Club Tijuana footballers
Salamanca F.C. footballers
Ascenso MX players
Major League Soccer players
Mexican expatriate footballers
Expatriate soccer players in the United States
Mexican expatriate sportspeople in the United States
Footballers from Guadalajara, Jalisco